C. alexanderi  may refer to:
 Catopsalis alexanderi, an extinct mammal species
 Christinus alexanderi, a gekko species found in the Nullarbor Plain of Australia

See also
 Alexanderi